The 1931 College Basketball All-Southern Team consisted of basketball players from the South chosen at their respective positions.

All-Southerns

Guards
Louis Berger, Maryland (AP)
Edward Ronkin, Maryland (AP)

Forwards
Louis McGinnis, Kentucky (AP)
Carey Spicer, Kentucky (AP)

Center
George Yates, Kentucky (AP)

Key
AP = chosen by the Associated Press.

References

All-Southern